Cuauhtemoc “Temoc” Suarez (born April 19, 1975 in Mount Pleasant, South Carolina) is a retired American soccer player who spent three seasons in Major League Soccer, two in the National Professional Soccer League and five in the USL First Division.  Suarez played for the United States Under-17 national team and also for the national futsal squad.

Youth
Suarez grew up in South Carolina, attending Bishop England High School in Charleston where he was a Parade Magazine high school All American.  In 1991, he was selected for the U.S. U-17 national team which qualified for the 1991 FIFA U-17 World Championship.  Suarez and his teammates finished 3-0 in group play, but fell in the second round to Qatar in penalty kicks after the two teams played to a 1–1 tie.  In 1993, Suarez entered UNC Chapel Hill, where he played on the Tar Heels men’s soccer team from 1993 to 1996.  Suarez was the 1993 Atlantic Coast Conference Rookie of the Year and a 1994 second team All American.  He finished his four years at UNC with 47 career goals.

Professional
In 1997, Long Island Rough Riders of the second division USISL selected Suarez in the first round (third overall) of the USISL Territorial Draft.  However, the Dallas Burn of first division Major League Soccer also chose Suarez in the first round (sixth overall) of the 1997 College Draft.  Suarez signed with the Burn, spending three seasons with them.  While with the Burn, Suarez went on loan several times to teams in the USISL.  The Burn released following the 1999 season.

In 2000, he joined his hometown club Charleston Battery of the USL A-League for one season.  That fall, he moved indoors with the Cleveland Crunch of the National Professional Soccer League (NPSL).  In 2001, the NPSL was renamed the Major Indoor Soccer League.  He would play two season with the Crunch until it folded and became the Force in 2002.  In August 2002, the Milwaukee Wave selected Suarez the first round (ninth overall) in the MISL dispersal draft, but he chose to concentrate on his outdoor career.  In 2001, Suarez left the Battery and joined the Connecticut Wolves for one season.  He then moved to the Rochester Raging Rhinos for the 2002 and 2003 seasons and the Syracuse Salty Dogs in 2004.  He retired from playing professionally following the 2004 season.

Futsal
Suarez earned seven caps with the United States national futsal team between 1999 and 2000 as the team prepared for the FIFA Futsal World Cup.  However, the U.S. failed to qualify.

Coaching
Following his retirement Suarez entered the field of youth coaching in his hometown of Charleston, founding Suarez Soccer School, a series of clinics focused on technical training for beginner-level players.  In 2010, Suarez was named boys varsity soccer coach at Pinewood Preparatory School in Summerville, South Carolina. Suarez also serves as director of the Charleston Battery's youth summer camps.

References

External links
 
 

1975 births
Living people
American soccer players
Atlanta Silverbacks players
Austin Lone Stars players
North Carolina Tar Heels men's soccer players
Parade High School All-Americans (boys' soccer)
Major League Soccer players
FC Dallas players
A-League (1995–2004) players
Charleston Battery players
Connecticut Wolves players
People from Mount Pleasant, South Carolina
Rochester New York FC players
Syracuse Salty Dogs players
National Professional Soccer League (1984–2001) players
New Orleans Riverboat Gamblers players
Major Indoor Soccer League (2001–2008) players
Cleveland Crunch players
American men's futsal players
American soccer coaches
United States men's youth international soccer players
FC Dallas draft picks
Soccer players from South Carolina
Association football forwards